The National Premier Leagues Women's (NPLW) are regional association football competitions in some states and territories in Australia, which act as the second tier of the sport in the country below the A-League Women. The WNPL consists of the highest level state league in a subset of the state-based federations within Australia, and is overseen by Football Australia (FA) in partnership with participating member federations.

With the addition of Northern NSW in 2022, the WNPL is now contested by clubs from seven member federations: Capital Football (ACT), NSW, Northern NSW, Queensland, South Australia, Victoria and Western Australia.

History
In October 2010, (FFA) commenced a National Competition Review, its main objective being to review the current structure of soccer competitions in Australia, and to monitor and improve elite player development. NSW were the first federation to commence a competition, after a review on women's football in NSW in 2013, which looked at staying aligned with the FFA's pathway for women's football program.

Queensland switched to the NPL format in 2015, followed by South Australia and Victoria in 2016, the ACT (Capital Football) in 2017, Western Australia in 2020, and Northern NSW in 2022.

Competition format and teams
The WNPL competitions in each state and territory are run independently by the member federations, with a similar format to the equivalent men's competition - the National Premier Leagues. Teams may be relegated from the WNPL to a third-tier league in the same state (and vice versa), but there is currently no mechanism for a team to be promoted to the first tier of Australian Football, the A-League Women.  The number of teams promoted and relegated from third-tier leagues per state has varied over time.  The table below details the number of teams relegated automatically from the WNPL at the end of the season and the number of NPL teams which go into a relegation playoff against a lower league team.

Current Clubs

Below are listed the National Premier Leagues clubs in each competing member federation announced for the 2023 season.

Honours

Premiers by season
Federations commenced under the WNPL Structure in different years.

Champions by season
Federations commenced under the WNPL Structure in different years.

See also

 National Premier Leagues
 Football Australia
 Australian soccer league system

Notes

References

Women's soccer leagues in Australia
National Premier Leagues
Football Australia
2
Recurring sporting events established in 2014
2014 establishments in Australia